Galangal is a common name for several tropical rhizomatous spices.

Differentiation
The word galangal, or its variant galanga or archaically galingale, can refer in common usage to the aromatic rhizome of any of four plant species in the Zingiberaceae (ginger) family, namely:
Alpinia galanga, also called greater galangal, lengkuas or laos
Alpinia officinarum, or lesser galangal
Boesenbergia rotunda, also called Chinese ginger or fingerroot
Kaempferia galanga, also called kencur, black galangal or sand ginger

The term galingale is sometimes also used for the rhizome of the unrelated sweet cyperus (Cyperus longus), traditionally used as a folk medicine in Europe.

Uses
Various galangal rhizomes are used in traditional Southeast Asian cuisine, such as Khmer kroeung (paste), Thai and Lao tom yum and tom kha gai soups, Vietnamese Huế cuisine (tré) and throughout Indonesian cuisine, as in soto and opor. Polish Żołądkowa Gorzka vodka is flavoured with galangal. While all varieties of galangal are closely related to common ginger, each is unique in its own right. Due to their unique taste profiles, galangals are not typically regarded as synonymous  with ginger or each other in traditional Asian dishes. It was popular in medieval Europe, where it was  generally known as "galingale".

In ethnobotany, galangal has been reported to be used for its purported merits in promoting digestion and alleviating respiratory diseases and stomach problems. Each galangal variety has been attributed specific medical virtues.

In commerce, galangals are commonly available in Asian markets as whole fresh rhizome, or in dried and sliced, or powdered form.

References

Medicinal plants
Zingiberaceae
Spices
Thai cuisine
Lao cuisine
Vietnamese cuisine
Indonesian cuisine
Plant common names